The Netherlands Bioinformatics for Proteomics Platform (NBPP) is joint initiative of the Netherlands Bioinformatics Centre (NBIC) and the Netherlands Proteomics Centre (NPC).

Its main goal is to provide user friendly, high-throughput data processing services to analyse proteomics liquid chromatography-mass spectrometry (LC-MS) data based on open source tools or tools developed and available within the platform members and build an infrastructure that will make possible for non-experts i.e. wet lab scientists to run a typical proteomics analysis pipelines and workflows, and for experts to experiment with different variations of the analysis.

References

External links 
 

Organisations based in the Netherlands
Proteomics organizations